Thornburg is a village in Keokuk County, Iowa, United States. The population was 45 at the time of the 2020 census.  Its sole enterprise is the Tri-County Community School, a public school serving grades K-12.

History
The Burlington, Cedar Rapids and Northern Railway built a 66-mile branch to What Cheer via Thornburg in 1879.  The town was founded by the railroad and named in memory of Major Thomas T. Thornburgh, who died in the Meeker Massacre.  By 1881, Thornburg was at the junction of the line to What Cheer and a branch to Montezuma.

Geography
Thornburg is located at  (41.454978, -92.333929).

Demographics

2010 census
At the 2010 census there were 67 people, 27 households, and 20 families living in the city. The racial makup of the city was 100.0% White. Hispanic or Latino of any race were 1.5%.

Of the 27 households 25.9% had children under the age of 18 living with them, 55.6% were married couples living together, 14.8% had a female householder with no husband present, 3.7% had a male householder with no wife present, and 25.9% were non-families. 22.2% of households were one person and 7.4% were one person aged 65 or older. The average household size was 2.48 and the average family size was 2.80.

The median age was 42.5 years. 22.4% of residents were under the age of 18; 7.6% were between the ages of 18 and 24; 21% were from 25 to 44; 34.3% were from 45 to 64; and 14.9% were 65 or older. The gender makeup of the city was 46.3% male and 53.7% female.

2000 census
As of the census of 2000, there were 84 people, 33 households, and 22 families living in the city. The racial makup of the city was 100.00% White.

Of the 33 households 30.3% had children under the age of 18 living with them, 60.6% were married couples living together, 3.0% had a female householder with no husband present, and 33.3% were non-families. 27.3% of households were one person and 12.1% were one person aged 65 or older. The average household size was 2.55 and the average family size was 3.14.

The age distribution was 19.0% under the age of 18, 16.7% from 18 to 24, 28.6% from 25 to 44, 22.6% from 45 to 64, and 13.1% 65 or older. The median age was 40 years. For every 100 females, there were 115.4 males. For every 100 females age 18 and over, there were 119.4 males.

The median household income was $45,313 and the median family income  was $42,500. Males had a median income of $26,250 versus $20,536 for females. The per capita income for the city was $15,954. There were 9.1% of families and 4.9% of the population living below the poverty line, including no under eighteens and 50.0% of those over 64.

Education
The Tri-County Community School District operates local area public schools.

References

Cities in Keokuk County, Iowa
Cities in Iowa
Populated places established in 1879
1879 establishments in Iowa